Simon Hillary (born 16 July 1992) is a professional rugby union player who plays as a winger for Leinster Rugby. Hillary is renowned for his speed and agility, as well as his deceptive footwork. While still at school, he was clocked at 10.6 seconds for the 100 metre sprint. Hillary is still in the Leinster academy, but is considered an excellent prospect for the future of both Leinster Rugby and Ireland. He has already starred for both the Leinster and Ireland u-20 rugby teams, and has made 3 appearances for the senior Leinster team to date, scoring a try on debut against Newport Gwent Dragons. While attending Blackrock College he helped the school to win both the Senior and Junior cup, and was on the same winning cup teams as fellow Leinster Rugby academy member and Irish u-20 star Neil R Barrett.

References

http://www.leinsterugby.ie/academyprofiles
http://www.blackrockcollege.com
http://www.tcd.ie
http://www.irishtimes.com/newspaper/sport/2012/0327/1224313955233.html
http://www.herald.ie/sport/rugby/tight-spot-for-kidney-3054387.html
http://www.independent.ie/sport/rugby/nice-introduction-for-macken-shows-leinster-academy-graduate-has-talent-to-make-the-grade-1867339.html

1992 births
Irish rugby union players
Leinster Rugby players
Living people
Rugby union wings
Rugby union players from Dublin (city)